Chateau Ste. It produces Chardonnay, Cabernet, Merlot, and Riesling, and has winemaking partnerships with two vintners: Col Solare is an alliance with Tuscany's Piero Antinori and Eroica Riesling is a partnership with the Mosel's Ernst Loosen. Chateau Ste. Michelle was selected as Wine Enthusiast magazine's 2004 American Winery of the Year. It was owned by Altria (formerly known as Phillip Morris), and then sold to the private equity firm Sycamore Partners in 2021.

History
Chateau Ste. Michelle is the oldest winery in Washington state. It was founded as the American Wine Company, a 1954 merger of the National Wine Company (NAWICO), founded in 1934, and the Pomerelle Wine Company. (For years, there was a large neon sign advertising NAWICO in Seattle's Wallingford neighborhood.) The property was added to the National Register of Historic Places in 1978.

Over the years, many Washington winemakers have gotten their start working for Chateau Ste. Michelle, these include Kay Simon of Chinook Wines, which she co-founded with her husband Clay Mackey who also worked as a vineyard manager for Chateau Ste. Michelle.

Wines

Chateau Ste. Michelle produces over 8,000,000 cases of Riesling wine per year. The winery owns several estate vineyards in Eastern Washington including the Canoe Ridge vineyard in the Horse Heaven Hills AVA, the Cold Creek vineyard and Indian Wells vineyards in the Columbia Valley AVA.

With the 2022 harvest, Chateau Ste. Michelle moved its white wine production from Woodinville to its facilities in eastern Washington to reduce freight trips and use of diesel fuel.

Activities
On the grounds of the winery is an amphitheater where outdoor concerts are performed in the summer.

See also
Woodinville wine country

References

External links

 
 History and information at vintners.net
Farm Workers in Washington State History Project, including photographs, oral histories, digitized newspaper articles and documents from the union organizing drive and ensuing international boycott of Chateau St. Michelle during the late 1980s and early 1990s.
 Rosalinda Guillen and Joseph Moore Papers. - Court Case Documents, Chateau Ste. Michelle Winery Picket, Joseph Moore Speeding Ticket

Wineries in Woodinville, Washington
American companies established in 1954
Agriculture companies established in 1954
1954 establishments in Washington (state)
Food and drink companies established in 1954